Karadagh Khanate, was a khanate established in the 18th century, with its capital at Ahar.

Khanate 
The khanate was founded in 1747 by Kazim khan Karadakhlu as an independent entity. Its territory had bordered with Talysh to east, Ardabil, Tabriz to south, Khoy to west, Nakhchivan, Karabagh and Javad khanates to north. Khanate's territory consisted mostly of Ungut, Karmaduz, Chalabiyan, Keyvan, Arazbar, Dizmar, Uzumdil, Hasanob, Kalaybar, Huseyneyli, Yaft, Garajurru, Dodanga, Chardanga, Dikla, Badbostan, Horat mahals. The founder Kazim khan pursued a prudent policy in regard to the neighboring feudal lords. He was more engaged in internal affairs and constructions, built several public buildings in khanate's capital Ahar. Khanate was under political dependence of Karabagh khanate for some period. In 1761 it was conquered by Karim Khan Zand and in 1791 by Mohammad Khan Qajar. In 1808 the khanate was finally disestablished.

Rulers

 Kazim khan — 1748-1752
Mustafakuli khan — (1763-1782, 1786-1791)
Ismail khan — (1782-1783, 1791-1797)
Najafkuli khan — (1783-1786)
Abbaskuli khan — (1797-1813)
Muhammadkuli khan — (1813-1828)

Ruling family 
Khanate's ruling family belonged to Toqmaqlu subclan of Ustajlu Turcomans. Enfeoffed by Tahmasp I as hereditary lords of Karadakh, they ranked 8th place in Kizilbash hierarchy, their earliest known ancestor was Ilyas Khalifa who was born in Sivas.

 Ilyas Khalifa (c. 1500)
 Shamsaddin Khalifa (d. 1603)
 Ilyas Khalifa II (d. 1610)
 Burhanaddin Khalifa (c. 1611)
 Shamsaddin Khalifa II (no issues)
 Ahmad Khalifa 
 Mahmud Sultan 
 Bayandur Sultan (c. 1701)
 Muhammadqasim khan (d. 1721)
 Abdurrazzaq khan (khan, later in 1725, Pasha of Ottoman Empire; d. 1729)
 Kazim khan (r. 1730-1763)
 Mustafakuli khan (r. 1763-1782, 1786-1791)
 Ismail khan (r. 1782-1783, 1791-1797)
 Abbaskuli khan (r. 1797-1813)
 Muhammadkuli khan — (r. 1813-1828; d. 1840)
 Hasanliagha khan (b. 1820, d. 1847)
 Hasanali khan Karadakhski (1848-1929)
 Mahammadhuseyn khan (b. 1827, d. 1891)
 Sadatquli khan
 Najafkuli khan (r. 1783-1786; d. 1818)

References 

History of East Azerbaijan Province